Tony Bristow was an English former cricketer. He was a left-handed batsman who played for Bedfordshire.

Born in New South Wales, Bristow made his 1st Grade debut at the age of 17. After playing 9 years for Charlestown he decided to come to England as a professional cricketer.

Bristow made three List A appearances for Bedfordshire between 2001 and 2002, his debut coming against Dorset. In spite of his position in the lower-middle order, Bristow never batted in his one-day career. He also played a total of 13 Minor Counties games for the team.

References

English cricketers
Bedfordshire cricketers
Living people
Place of birth missing (living people)
Year of birth missing (living people)